The Asellia gens was an ancient Roman clan.

Members

Republican
Marcus Asellius, Tribune of the plebs in 422 BC
Marcus (M. f.) Asellius, senator in 44 BC and friend of Cluentius of Pro Cluentio.
Lucius Asellius, praetor in 33 BC.
(L. f.) Asellius, Praetor suffectus in 33 BC.

Imperial
 Asellius Sabinus, awarded 200,000 sesterces by emperor Tiberius for a dialogue between a truffle, a fig-pecker, an oyster, and a thrush.
 Asellius Aemilianus, supporter of Pescennius Niger.

See also
 List of Roman gentes

References

Roman gentes